Almir Moraes Andrade (born May 11, 1973) is a former Brazilian football player.

Club statistics

References

External links

アウミール

1973 births
Living people
Brazilian footballers
Categoría Primera A players
J1 League players
J2 League players
Japan Football League (1992–1998) players
Tokushima Vortis players
FC Tokyo players
Hokkaido Consadole Sapporo players
Club Athletico Paranaense players
Goiás Esporte Clube players
América de Cali footballers
América Futebol Clube (SP) players
Coritiba Foot Ball Club players
Brazilian expatriate footballers
Expatriate footballers in Japan
Expatriate footballers in Colombia
Association football midfielders